McRuer may refer to:

Donald McRuer (1826–1898), American politician and Congressman
Robert McRuer (born 1966), American theorist in transnational queer and disability studies
James Chalmers McRuer (1890–1985), Canadian lawyer, judge, commissioner and author
Duane McRuer (1925–2007), American engineer